Alentejo is a geographical, historical and cultural region of Portugal.

Alentejo may also refer to:

Regions
Alentejo Central
Alentejo Litoral
Alentejo Region
Alentejo Province

Places
Viana do Alentejo
Ferreira do Alentejo
Southwest Alentejo and Vicentine Coast Natural Park

Others
Alentejan Portuguese
Alentejo wine
Cante Alentejano
Linha do Alentejo
Rafeiro do Alentejo
Volta ao Alentejo

See also
Alto Alentejo (disambiguation)
Baixo Alentejo (disambiguation)